PMLN  may refer to:

 Pakistan Muslim League (N)
 Partido Morazanista de Liberación Nacional